Imaginary Friend is the second and final studio album by English indie rock band Th' Faith Healers, released in 1993 by Too Pure. It was released by Elektra Records in the United States.

Critical reception
In a 1994 profile of Th' Faith Healers in Spin, journalist Jim Greer wrote that Imaginary Friend saw the band refining their groove-oriented noise rock sound and experimenting with more varied musical styles. AllMusic critic Stewart Mason retrospectively characterised it as "darker and less manic" than their 1992 debut album Lido. MusicHound Rock: The Essential Album Guide wrote that "songs stretch to their limits, and the overwhelming tension that the band is able to eke out of such a seemingly simplistic approach is a fascinating achievement." Greil Marcus, in Artforum, wrote: "Using repetition, distance, and the sort of indecipherable echoes that still make Moby Grape's 'Indifference' feel unstable, the group works with negative space, creating it, filling it, then leaving it empty again."

Track listing

Notes

1993 albums
Th' Faith Healers albums